Johann Gottfried Ludwig Kosegarten (10 September 1792, in Altenkirchen – 18 August 1860, in Greifswald) was a German orientalist born in Altenkirchen on the island of Rügen. He was the son of ecclesiastic Ludwig Gotthard Kosegarten (1758–1818).

He studied theology and philosophy at the University of Greifswald, and from 1812 studied Oriental languages in Paris. In 1815 he became an adjunct to the theological and philosophical faculty in Greifswald. From 1817 to 1824 he was a professor of Oriental languages at the University of Jena, and afterwards a professor at Greifswald.

Kosegarten is remembered for translation and edition of Arabic, Persian and Sanskrit poems, songs and fables. His principal work included the Arab song collection Kitab al-Aghani (1846), the Hindu poem Nala (1820), the Persian fairy tale collection Tuti Nameh (1822) and the Indian fable collection Pantscha Tantra (1848). He was also a specialist at deciphering ancient Egyptian hieroglyphics.

In 1856–57 Kosegarten was author of a two-volume work on the history of the University of Greifswald called Geschichte der Universität Greifswald. His handwritten notes and collection of German and Oriental works were bequeathed to the University of Greifswald.

Books
  (pp. 115 -123: Al-Maqrizi,  History of the Fatimites)

References 
 This article is based on a translation of an equivalent article at the German Wikipedia, whose references are listed as:
 ADB: Kosegarten, Gottfried @ Allgemeine Deutsche Biographie
 Klaus-Gunther Wesseling: KOSEGARTEN, Johann Gottfried Ludwig. In: Biographisch-Bibliographisches Kirchenlexikon (BBKL). Band 4, Bautz, Herzberg 1992, Sp. 535–537.

1792 births
1860 deaths
People from Vorpommern-Rügen
People from Swedish Pomerania
German orientalists
University of Greifswald alumni
Academic staff of the University of Greifswald
Academic staff of the University of Jena
German male non-fiction writers